The Hawaii Senate (Hawaiian: Ka ‘Aha Kenekoa) is the upper house of the Hawaii State Legislature. It consists of twenty-five members elected from an equal number of constituent districts across the islands and is led by the President of the Senate, elected from the membership of the body, currently Ron Kouchi. The forerunner of the Hawaii Senate during the government of the Kingdom of Hawaii was the House of Nobles originated in 1840. In 1894, the Constitution of the Republic of Hawaii renamed the upper house the present senate. Senators are elected to four-year terms and are not subject to term limits.

Like most state legislatures in the United States, the Hawaii State Senate is a part-time body and senators often have active careers outside government. The lower house of the legislature is the Hawaii House of Representatives. The membership of the Senate also elects additional officers to include the Senate Vice President, Senate Chief Clerk, Assistant Chief Clerk, Senate Sergeant at Arms, and Assistant Sergeant at Arms. The Hawaii Senate convenes in the Hawaii State Capitol in Honolulu.

Composition
The Democrats have controlled the chamber since 1963, and have held a supermajority since 1984.

From 2016 (when Sen. Sam Slom, Hawaii's sole Republican state Senator, was defeated in his bid for reelection) to 2018, the Democratic Party held all 25 seats in the Hawaii Senate. This made the Hawaii Senate the only state legislative chamber with no opposition members (this excludes the officially nonpartisan Nebraska Legislature). It was the first time since 1980 (when both the Alabama Senate and Louisiana Senate were all-Democratic) that any state legislative chamber had been completely dominated by a single party.

Leadership

Officers

List of current members

Capitol
The Hawaiʻi State Senate has been meeting at the Hawaiʻi State Capitol in downtown Honolulu since March 15, 1969. Previous to the decision of Governor John A. Burns to build the new Capitol building, the Hawaiʻi State Senate met in ʻIolani Palace.

Past composition of the Senate

References

External links
Hawaiʻi State Legislature
Hawaiʻi State House of Representatives
Hawaiʻi State Senate
Hawaiʻi State Legislature Legislative Reference Bureau
State Senate of Hawaiʻi at Project Vote Smart

 

Hawaii Legislature
State upper houses in the United States